is a railway station on the Echigo Line in the city of  Nagaoka, Niigata Prefecture, Japan, operated by East Japan Railway Company (JR East).

Lines

Station layout
The station has one side platform serving a single bidirectional track.

The station is unattended. Suica farecard cannot be used at this station.

History
The station opened on 5 December 1919. With the privatization of Japanese National Railways (JNR) on 1 April 1987, the station came under the control of JR East.

Surrounding area
 
Kirihara Post Office

See also
 List of railway stations in Japan

References

External links

 JR East station information 

Railway stations in Nagaoka, Niigata
Echigo Line
Stations of East Japan Railway Company
Railway stations in Japan opened in 1919